Filip Krajinović was the defending champion, but he lost in the quarterfinals to Máximo González.

Paolo Lorenzi won the tournament, defeating González in the final, 6–3, 7–5.

Seeds

Draw

Finals

Top half

Bottom half

External links
 Main Draw
 Qualifying Draw

International Tennis Tournament of Cortina - Singles
2015 Singles